Charles Launcelot Garland (1854 – 7 January 1930) was a New Zealand-born Australian politician and mining entrepreneur. He was the founder of the town of Leadville, N.S.W.

He was born at Auckland to sea captain William Riley Garland and Nancy Turner. He was a miner from an early age, and migrated to New South Wales in 1879. Around 1882 he married Mary Newland, with whom he had a son. Garland died in Sydney in 1930, and was buried at the Gore Hill Cemetery.

Business career 
From 1882 he was an assurance agent, and was also successful mining at Leadville, on the Palmer River in Far North Queensland, and on the Macquarie River.

Garland is credited with being the first to introduce gold dredging—a technique used extensively in his native New Zealand—to New South Wales, He launched the first gold dredge on the Macquarie in 1899. By 1905, there were 42 dredges working in New South Wales, resulting in a significant revival of gold production.

Political career 
In 1885 he was elected to the New South Wales Legislative Assembly as the member for Carcoar. He retired in 1891.

See also 

 Leadville, New South Wales

References

 

1854 births
1930 deaths
Members of the New South Wales Legislative Assembly
Free Trade Party politicians